Monochroa rumicetella is a moth of the family Gelechiidae. It was described by O. Hofmann in 1868. It is found from Fennoscandia and Belarus to Portugal, the Alps and Greece, and from France to Romania.

The wingspan is 10–11 mm. Adults are on wing in May.

The larvae feed on Rumex acetosa and Rumex acetosella. They mine the leaves of their host plant. The mine has the form of a full-depth blotch. Pupation takes place outside of the mine. Larvae can be found in July and August.

References

 "Monochroa rumicetella (O. Hofmann, 1868)". Insecta.pro. Retrieved February 5, 2020.

Moths described in 1868
Monochroa
Moths of Europe